The 1952 FIVB Men's World Championship was the second edition of the tournament, organised by the world's governing body, the FIVB. It was held from 17 to 29 August 1952 in Moscow, Soviet Union.

Teams

Pool A
 
 
 
 

Pool B
 
 
 
  (Host)

Pool C

Results

First round

Pool A

|}

|}

Pool B

|}

|}

Pool C

|}

|}

Final round

7th–11th places

|}

|}

Final places

|}

|}

Final standing

External links
 Results at FIVB.org
 Sports Database

W
FIVB Men's World Championship
FIVB Men's World Championship
V
FIVB Volleyball Men's World Championship
Sports competitions in Moscow